Montez Murphy (born January 6, 1982 in Meridian, Mississippi) is a former gridiron football defensive tackle. He was signed by the Kansas City Chiefs as an undrafted free agent in 2006. He played college football for the Baylor Bears.

Murphy was also a member of the Green Bay Packers, Edmonton Eskimos, Winnipeg Blue Bombers, Hamilton Tiger-Cats and Saskatchewan Roughriders.

1982 births
Living people
Sportspeople from Meridian, Mississippi
Players of American football from Mississippi
American football defensive tackles
American players of Canadian football
Canadian football defensive linemen
Baylor Bears football players
Kansas City Chiefs players
Edmonton Elks players
Winnipeg Blue Bombers players
Hamilton Tiger-Cats players
Saskatchewan Roughriders players
Green Bay Packers players